is a former Japanese football player. She played for Japan national team.

Club career
Yamaki was born in Chiba Prefecture on 2 October 1975. She joined for Nissan FC in 1989. In 1989 season, she was selected Young players awards. However, the club was disbanded in 1993. In 1994, she moved to Nikko Securities Dream Ladies. The club won L.League championship for 3 years in a row (1996-1998). She was also selected MVP awards in 1997 season. However, the club was disbanded in 1998 due to financial strain. She moved to German Bundesliga club Frankfurt. In 2003, she returned to Japan and joined Ohara Gakuen JaSRA. She retired end of 2004 season. She was also selected Best Eleven for 5 years in a row (1993-1997).

National team career
In December 1993, when Yamaki was 18 years old, she was selected Japan national team for 1993 AFC Championship. At this competition, on 4 December, she debuted against Chinese Taipei. She also played at 1994, 1998 Asian Games, 1995 and 1997 AFC Championship. She was a member of Japan for 1995, 1999 World Cup and 1996 Summer Olympics. She played 50 games and scored 3 goals for Japan until 1999. She was also the captain.

National team statistics

References

External links
 

1975 births
Living people
Association football people from Chiba Prefecture
Japanese women's footballers
Japan women's international footballers
Nadeshiko League players
Nissan FC Ladies players
Nikko Securities Dream Ladies players
AC Nagano Parceiro Ladies players
1. FFC Frankfurt players
1995 FIFA Women's World Cup players
Olympic footballers of Japan
Footballers at the 1996 Summer Olympics
Asian Games medalists in football
Footballers at the 1998 Asian Games
Footballers at the 1994 Asian Games
Women's association football defenders
Asian Games silver medalists for Japan
Asian Games bronze medalists for Japan
Medalists at the 1994 Asian Games
Medalists at the 1998 Asian Games
1999 FIFA Women's World Cup players
Nadeshiko League MVPs